The 1958 Georgia Tech Yellow Jackets football team represented the Georgia Institute of Technology during the 1958 NCAA University Division football season. The Yellow Jackets were led by 14th-year head coach Bobby Dodd, played their home games at Grant Field in Atlanta, and compiled a 5–4–1 record.

The team's statistical leaders included Fred Braselton with 310 passing yards and Floyd Faucette with 473 rushing yards.

Schedule

Source:

References

Georgia Tech
Georgia Tech Yellow Jackets football seasons
Georgia Tech Yellow Jackets football